Tegelbacken is a junction at Norrmalm in Central Stockholm and the name of several streets that contains the junction. At Tegelbacken the traffic are connected to the Centralbron, Vasabron, Nynäsvägen and Gamla stan.

References

Streets in Stockholm